The 1997 Baltimore Orioles season saw the Orioles finishing 1st in the American League East Division with a record of 98 wins and 64 losses. They met the Seattle Mariners in the ALDS, and beat them in 4 games. However, in the ALCS, they would play the Cleveland Indians, where they would fall in 6 games.  It would be their last winning season until 15 years later.

Offseason
December 10, 1996: Jimmy Key was signed as a free agent with the Baltimore Orioles.
December 13, 1996: Mike Bordick was signed as a free agent with the Baltimore Orioles.
December 18, 1996: Jerome Walton was signed as a free agent with the Baltimore Orioles.
December 19, 1996: Eric Davis was signed as a free agent with the Baltimore Orioles.
March 22, 1997: Scott McClain was traded by the Baltimore Orioles with Manny Alexander to the New York Mets for Hector Ramirez.

Roster

Regular season

Season standings

Record vs. opponents

Game log

|- style="text-align:center;background-color:#bbffbb"
| 1 || April 2 || Royals || 7 – 4 || Key (1–0) || Walker (0–1) || Myers (1) || 46,588 || 1–0
|- style="text-align:center;background-color:#bbffbb"
| 2 || April 3 || Royals || 6 – 4 || Rhodes (1–0) || Montgomery (0–1) || Myers (2) || 43,031 || 2–0
|- style="text-align:center;background-color:#bbffbb"
| 3 || April 4 || @Rangers || 5 – 4 || Erickson (1–0) || Patterson (0–1) || Benítez (1) || 26,058 || 3–0
|- style="text-align:center;background-color:#bbffbb"
| 4 || April 5 || @Rangers || 9 – 7 || Rhodes (2–0) || Oliver (0–1) || Myers (3) || 39,073 || 4–0
|- style="text-align:center;background-color:#ffbbbb"
| 5 || April 6 || @Rangers || 9 – 3 || Pavlik (1–0) || Mussina (0–1) ||  || 36,156 || 4–1
|- style="text-align:center;background-color:#ffbbbb"
| 6 || April 7 || @Royals || 6 – 5 || Walker (1–1) || Benítez (0–1) ||  || 40,052 || 4–2
|- style="text-align:center;background-color:#bbffbb"
| 7 || April 9 || @Royals || 4 – 2  || Mills (1–0) || Bevil (0–1) || Myers (4) || 12,036 || 5–2
|- style="text-align:center;background-color:#bbffbb"
| 8 || April 11 || Rangers || 9 – 3 || Mussina (1–1) || Burkett (0–1) ||  || 40,575 || 6–2
|- style="text-align:center;background-color:#bbffbb"
| 9 || April 13 || Rangers || 9 – 0 || Key (2–0) || Pavlik (1–1) ||  || 44,154 || 7–2
|- style="text-align:center;background-color:#bbffbb"
| 10 || April 14 || Twins || 4 – 2 || Erickson (2–0) || Tewksbury (0–2) || Myers (5) || 36,288 || 8–2
|- style="text-align:center;background-color:#bbffbb"
| 11 || April 15 || Twins || 3 – 1 || Kamieniecki (1–0) || Aldred (0–2) || Myers (6) || 40,196 || 9–2
|- style="text-align:center;background-color:#ffbbbb"
| 12 || April 16 || @White Sox || 9 – 3 || Drabek (1–1) || Boskie (0–1) ||  || 14,061 || 9–3
|- style="text-align:center;background-color:#bbffbb"
| 13 || April 17 || @White Sox || 1 – 0 || Mussina (2–1) || Darwin (0–1) || Myers (7) || 14,674 || 10–3
|- style="text-align:center;background-color:#bbffbb"
| 14 || April 20 || @Red Sox || 11 – 1 || Key (3–0) || Gordon (1–2) ||  || 32,290 || 11–3
|- style="text-align:center;background-color:#ffbbbb"
| 15 || April 21 || @Red Sox || 4 – 2 || Sele (3–0) || Erickson (2–1) || Slocumb (3) || 33,608 || 11–4
|- style="text-align:center;background-color:#bbffbb"
| 16 || April 22 || White Sox || 3 – 2 || Mussina (3–1) || Darwin (0–2) || Myers (8) || 38,392 || 12–4
|- style="text-align:center;background-color:#ffbbbb"
| 17 || April 23 || White Sox || 11 – 9  || Castillo (2–2) || Benítez (0–2) || Hernandez (3) || 42,902 || 12–5
|- style="text-align:center;background-color:#ffbbbb"
| 18 || April 24 || Red Sox || 2 – 1  || Trlicek (3–4) || Mathews (0–1) || Henry (4) || 40,000 || 12–6
|- style="text-align:center;background-color:#bbffbb"
| 19 || April 25 || Red Sox || 2 – 0 || Erickson (3–1) || Gordon (1–3) || Myers (9) || 45,227 || 13–6
|- style="text-align:center;background-color:#bbffbb"
| 20 || April 26 || Red Sox || 14 – 5 || Key (4–0) || Sele (3–1) || Johnson (1) || 47,727 || 14–6
|- style="text-align:center;background-color:#ffbbbb"
| 21 || April 27 || Red Sox || 13 – 7 || Henry (1–0) || Rhodes (2–1) || || 47,307 || 14–7
|- style="text-align:center;background-color:#bbffbb"
| 22 || April 29 || Twins || 6 – 4 || Boskie (1–1) || Swindell (1–1) || Myers (10) || 11,368 || 15–7
|- style="text-align:center;background-color:#bbffbb"
| 23 || April 30 || Twins || 12 – 3 || Kamieniecki (2–0) || Tewksbury (1–4) || Benítez (2) || 12,686 || 16–7

|- style="text-align:center;background-color:#bbffbb"
| 24 || May 1 || Twins || 3–2 || Erickson (4–1) || Aldred (1–3) || Myers (11) || 11,678 || 17–7
|- style="text-align:center;background-color:#bbffbb"
| 25 || May 2 || Athletics || 7–1 || Key (5–0) || Karsay (0–3) ||  || 46,181 || 18–7
|- style="text-align:center;background-color:#ffbbbb"
| 26 || May 3 || Athletics || 4–3 || Small (4–0) || Myers (0–1) || Taylor (6) || 45,780 || 18–8
|- style="text-align:center;background-color:#bbffbb"
| 27 || May 4 || Athletics || 11–0 || Coppinger (1–0) || Prieto (2–2) || Johnson (2) || 47,001 || 19–8
|- style="text-align:center;background-color:#ffbbbb"
| 28 || May 5 || Angels || 7–2 || Dickson (5–1) || Kamieniecki (2–1) || James (3) || 41,296 || 19–9
|- style="text-align:center;background-color:#bbffbb"
| 29 || May 6 || Angels || 8–4 || Erickson (5–1) || Finley (0–2) || Myers (12) || 37,150 || 20–9
|- style="text-align:center;background-color:#bbffbb"
| 30 || May 7 || Angels || 3–0 || Key (6–0) || Watson (0–2) || Myers (13) || 43,858 || 21–9
|- style="text-align:center;background-color:#bbffbb"
| 31 || May 8 || Mariners || 13–3 || Mussina (4–1) || Johnson (4–1) || || 45,026 || 22–9
|- style="text-align:center;background-color:#ffbbbb"
| 32 || May 9 || Mariners || 8–2 || Moyer (2–0) || Coppinger (1–1) || || 47,257 || 22–10
|- style="text-align:center;background-color:#ffbbbb"
| 33 || May 10 || Mariners || 3 – 2 (11) || Charlton (2–1) || Myers (0–2) || || 47,340 || 22–11
|- style="text-align:center;background-color:#bbffbb"
| 34 || May 11 || Mariners || 9–5 || Erickson (6–1) || Martínez (1–3) || || 47,451 || 23–11
|- style="text-align:center;background-color:#bbffbb"
| 35 || May 12 || Athletics || 5–1 || Key (7–0) || Karsay (0–4) || Benítez (3) || 11,352 || 24–11
|- style="text-align:center;background-color:#bbffbb"
| 36 || May 13 || Athletics || 7–3 || Mussina (5–1) || Mohler (0–5) || || 14,854 || 25–11
|- style="text-align:center;background-color:#ffbbbb"
| 37 || May 14 || Angels || 6–5 || Springer (1–1) || Boskie (1–2) || Holtz (1) || 15,780 || 25–12
|- style="text-align:center;background-color:#ffbbbb"
| 38 || May 15 || Angels || 3–2 || Dickson (6–1) || Kamieniecki (2–2) || James (5) || 15,966 || 25–13
|- style="text-align:center;background-color:#bbffbb"
| 39 || May 16 || Mariners || 6–3 || Erickson (7–1) || Martínez (1–4) || || 39,455 || 26–13
|- style="text-align:center;background-color:#bbffbb"
| 40 || May 17 || Mariners || 4–3 || Key (8–0) || Sanders (0–5) || Benítez (4) || 57,304 || 27–13
|- style="text-align:center;background-color:#bbffbb"
| 41 || May 18 || Mariners || 8–7 || Orosco (1–0) || Charlton (2–3) || Benítez (5) || 57,432 || 28–13
|- style="text-align:center;background-color:#bbffbb"
| 42 || May 20 || Tigers || 4–3 || Kamieniecki  (3–2) || Olivares (2–3) || Myers (14) || 48,003 || 29–13
|- style="text-align:center;background-color:#bbffbb"
| 43 || May 21 || Tigers || 2–0 || Erickson (8–1) || Thompson (4–3) || Myers (15) || 47,877 || 30–13
|- style="text-align:center;background-color:#ffbbbb"
| 44 || May 23 || Indians || 6–1 || Ogea (5–3) || Key (8–1) || || 41,154 || 30–14
|- style="text-align:center;background-color:#bbffbb"
| 45 || May 24 || Indians || 8–3 || Mussina (6–1) || Kline (3–1) || || 41,040 || 31–14
|- style="text-align:center;background-color:#ffbbbb"
| 46 || May 25 || Indians || 7–6 || Nagy (6–2) || Rhodes (2–2) || Morman (2) || 42,944 || 31–15
|- style="text-align:center;background-color:#bbffbb"
| 47 || May 26 || Yankees || 8–6 || Boskie (2–2) || Pettittie (6–3) || Myers (16) || 40,296 || 32–15
|- style="text-align:center;background-color:#bbffbb"
| 48 || May 27 || Yankees || 10–6 || Kamieniecki (2–2) || Rogers (6–3) || Benítez (6) || 29,392 || 33–15
|- style="text-align:center;background-color:#bbffbb"
| 49 || May 28 || Yankees || 8–1 || Key (9–1) || Moehler (3–4) || Boskie (1) || 10,692 || 34–15
|- style="text-align:center;background-color:#bbffbb"
| 50 || May 30 || Indians || 3–0 || Mussina (7–1) || Nagy (6–3) || || 47,758 || 35–15
|- style="text-align:center;background-color:#bbffbb"
| 51 || May 31 || Indians || 8–5 || Boskie (3–2) || Mesa (0–3) || Myers (17) || 47,739 || 36–15

|- style="text-align:center;background-color:#bbffbb"
| 52 || June 3 || Yankees || 7–5 || Myers (1–2) || Mecir (0–3) || || 47,577 || 37–15
|- style="text-align:center;background-color:#bbffbb"
| 53 || June 4 || Yankees || 9–7 || Orosco (2–0) || Nelson (2–5) || Myers (18) || 47,748 || 38–15
|- style="text-align:center;background-color:#ffbbbb"
| 54 || June 6 || @ White Sox || 7–3 || Drabek (5–4) || Erickson (8–2) || R. Hernandez (12) || 21,304 || 38–16
|- style="text-align:center;background-color:#ffbbbb"
| 55 || June 7 || @ White Sox || 1 – 0  || R. Hernández (4–1) || Myers (1–3) || || 31,548 || 38–17
|- style="text-align:center;background-color:#bbffbb"
| 56 || June 8 || @ White Sox || 2–1 || Key (10–1) || Darwin (2–3) || Myers (19) || 24,089 || 39–17
|- style="text-align:center;background-color:#bbffbb"
| 57 || June 9 || @ White Sox || 10–2 || Mussina (8–1) || Baldwin (3–8) || || 23,464 || 40–17
|- style="text-align:center;background-color:#bbffbb"
| 58 || June 10 || @ Red Sox || 7–2 || Erickson (9–2) || Eshelman (0–1) || || || 41–17
|- style="text-align:center;background-color:#bbffbb"
| 59 || June 10 || @ Red Sox || 4–2 || Rhodes (3–2) || Wakefield (2–5) || Myers (20) || 30,995 || 42–17
|- style="text-align:center;background-color:#ffbbbb"
| 60 || June 11 || @ Red Sox || 10–1 || Gordon (4–6) || Johnson (0–1) || || 26,479 || 42–18
|- style="text-align:center;background-color:#ffbbbb"
| 61 || June 12 || @ Red Sox || 9–5 || Sele (7–5) || Kamieniecki (4–3) || || 24,970 || 42–19
|- style="text-align:center;background-color:#bbffbb"
| 62 || June 13 || @ Braves || 4 – 3 || Key (11–1) || Maddux (7–3) || Myers (21) || 48,334 || 43–19
|- style="text-align:center;background-color:#bbffbb"
| 63 || June 14 || @ Braves || 6 – 4 || Rhodes (4–2) || Borowski (2–2) || Myers (22) || 26,964 || 44–19
|- style="text-align:center;background-color:#bbffbb"
| 64 || June 15 || @ Braves || 5 – 3 || Mathews (1–1) || Wohlers (2–2) || Myers (23) || 48,088 || 45–19
|- style="text-align:center;background-color:#ffbbbb"
| 65 || June 16 || Expos || 6 – 4 || Hermanson (3–4) || Boskie (3–3) || Urbina (12) || 47,557 || 45–20
|- style="text-align:center;background-color:#bbffbb"
| 66 || June 17 || Expos || 5 – 4 || Kamieniecki (5–3) || Bullinger (4–6) || Myers (24) || 47,793 || 46–20
|- style="text-align:center;background-color:#ffbbbb"
| 67 || June 18 || Expos || 1 – 0 || C. Perez (8–4) || Key (11–2) ||  || 47,448 || 46–21
|- style="text-align:center;background-color:#ffbbbb"
| 68 || June 20 || @ Blue Jays || 3 – 0 || Hentgen (8–3) || Mussina (8–2) ||  || 30,266 || 46–22
|- style="text-align:center;background-color:#bbffbb"
| 69 || June 21 || @ Blue Jays || 5 – 1 || Erickson (10–2) || Plesac (0–3) ||  || 40,139 || 47–22
|- style="text-align:center;background-color:#bbffbb"
| 70 || June 22 || @ Blue Jays || 5 – 2 || Kamieniecki (6–3) || Person (2–5) || Myers (25) || 35,106 || 48–22
|- style="text-align:center;background-color:#ffbbbb"
| 71 || June 23 || @ Brewers || 5 – 0 || D'Amico (5–3) || Key (11–3) ||  || 16,304 || 48–23
|- style="text-align:center;background-color:#bbffbb"
| 72 || June 24 || @ Brewers || 6 – 2 || Boskie (4–3) || Karl (2–9) || Rhodes (1) || 14,007 || 49–23
|- style="text-align:center;background-color:#bbffbb"
| 73 || June 25 || @ Brewers || 9 – 1 || Mussina (9–2) || Eldred (7–8) ||  || 21,042 || 50–23
|- style="text-align:center;background-color:#ffbbbb"
| 74 || June 26 || Blue Jays || 3 – 0 || Clemens (12–2) || Erickson (10–3) || Timlin (7) || 47,617 || 50–24
|- style="text-align:center;background-color:#ffbbbb"
| 75 || June 27 || Blue Jays || 2 – 1 || Person (3–5) || Kamieniecki (6–4) || Spoljaric (2) || 47,900 || 50–25
|- style="text-align:center;background-color:#ffbbbb"
| 76 || June 28 || Blue Jays || 5 – 2 || W. Williams (3–7) || Key (11–4) || Timlin (8) || 47,687 || 50–26
|- style="text-align:center;background-color:#ffbbbb"
| 77 || June 29 || Blue Jays || 3 – 2 || Escobar (1–0) || Benítez (0–3) || Timlin (9) || 47,763 || 50–27
|- style="text-align:center;background-color:#bbffbb"
| 78 || June 30 || Phillies || 8 – 1 || Mussina (10–2) || Maduro (3–7) || || 47,837 || 51–27

|- style="text-align:center;background-color:#bbffbb"
| 79 || July 1 || Phillies || 4 – 1 || Erickson (11–3) || Beech (0–4) || Myers (26) || 47,610 || 52–27
|- style="text-align:center;background-color:#bbffbb"
| 80 || July 2 || Phillies || 10 – 6 || Rhodes (5–2) || Spradlin (1–4) || || 47,785 || 53–27
|- style="text-align:center;background-color:#bbffbb"
| 81 || July 3 || @ Tigers || 10 – 1 || Key (12–4) || Lira (5–5) || || 13,209 || 54–27
|- style="text-align:center;background-color:#bbffbb"
| 82 || July 4 || @ Tigers || 4 – 3 || Rhodes (6–2) || Keagle (0–1) || Myers (27) || 30,100 || 55–27
|- style="text-align:center;background-color:#ffbbbb"
| 83 || July 4 || @ Tigers || 11 – 8 || Bautista (2–2) || Mills (1–1) || T. Jones (12) || 30,100 || 55–28
|- style="text-align:center;background-color:#ffbbbb"
| 84 || July 5 || @ Tigers || 6 – 5 || Miceli (2–1) || Orosco (2–1) || T. Jones (13) || 37,074 || 55–29
|- style="text-align:center;background-color:#ffbbbb"
| 85 || July 6 || @ Tigers || 14 – 9 || Blair (6–4) || Erickson (11–4) ||  || 18,197 || 55–30
|- style="text-align:center;background-color:#ffbbbb"
| 86 || July 11 || Brewers || 3 – 1 || McDonald (8–6) || Key (12–5) || D. Jones (21) || 47,919 || 55–31
|- style="text-align:center;background-color:#ffbbbb"
| 87 || July 12 || Brewers || 3 – 2 || Eldred (9–8) || Erickson (11–5) || D. Jones (22) || 47,606 || 55–32
|- style="text-align:center;background-color:#ffbbbb"
| 88 || July 13 || Brewers || 6 – 4 || D'Amico (7–4) || Mussina (10–3) || D. Jones (23) || 47,448 || 55–33
|- style="text-align:center;background-color:#bbffbb"
| 89 || July 14 || Blue Jays || 9 – 5 || Mathews (2–1) || Person (3–6) || || 47,042 || 56–33
|- style="text-align:center;background-color:#bbffbb"
| 90 || July 15 || Blue Jays || 8 – 4 || Boskie (5–3) || Guzmán (3–6) || || 47,062 || 57–33
|- style="text-align:center;background-color:#ffbbbb"
| 91 || July 16 || Red Sox || 4 – 1 || Avery (3–2) || Key (12–6) || Slocumb (12) || 47,712 || 57–34
|- style="text-align:center;background-color:#ffbbbb"
| 92 || July 17 || Red Sox || 12 – 9 || Mahay (1–0) || Orosco (2–2) || Slocumb (13) || 47,912 || 57–35
|- style="text-align:center;background-color:#ffbbbb"
| 93 || July 18 || White Sox || 3 – 0 || Baldwin (7–9) || Mussina (10–4) || R. Hernández (24) || 47,759 || 57–36
|- style="text-align:center;background-color:#bbffbb"
| 94 || July 19 || White Sox || 8 – 3 || Rhodes (7–2) || Simas (3–1) || Benítez (7) || 47,857 || 58–36
|- style="text-align:center;background-color:#ffbbbb"
| 95 || July 20 || White Sox || 10 – 2 || Navarro (8–8) || Boskie (5–4) || || 47,800 || 58–37
|- style="text-align:center;background-color:#bbffbb"
| 96 || July 21 || @ Rangers || 5 – 1 || Key (13–6) || Oliver (6–10) || || 35,842 || 59–37
|- style="text-align:center;background-color:#bbffbb"
| 97 || July 22 || @ Rangers || 9 – 3 || Erickson (12–5) || Burkett (7–9) || || 43,421 || 60–37
|- style="text-align:center;background-color:#bbffbb"
| 98 || July 23 || @ Rangers || 3 – 2 || Myers (2–3) || Patterson (6–4) || || 40,834 || 61–37
|- style="text-align:center;background-color:#ffbbbb"
| 99 || July 25 || @ Twins || 5 – 2 || Radke (14–5) || Kamieniecki (6–5) || || 21,524 || 61–38

Player stats

Batting

Starters by position
Note: Pos = Position; G = Games played; AB = At bats; R = Runs; H = Hits; Avg. = Batting average; HR = Home runs; RBI = Runs batted in

Other batters
Note: G = Games played; AB = At bats; H = Hits; Avg. = Batting average; HR = Home runs; RBI = Runs batted in

Pitching

Starting pitchers 
Note: G = Games pitched; IP = Innings pitched; W = Wins; L = Losses; ERA = Earned run average; SO = Strikeouts

Other pitchers 
Note: G = Games pitched; IP = Innings pitched; W = Wins; L = Losses; ERA = Earned run average; SO = Strikeouts

Relief pitchers 
Note: G = Games pitched; IP = Innings pitched; W = Wins; L = Losses; SV = Saves; ERA = Earned run average; SO = Strikeouts

ALDS

Game 1
October 1, Kingdome

Game 2
October 2, Kingdome

Game 3
October 4, Oriole Park at Camden Yards

Game 4
October 5, Oriole Park at Camden Yards

ALCS

Game 1
October 8, Camden Yards

Game 2
October 9, Camden Yards

Game 3
October 11, Jacobs Field

Game 4
October 12, Jacobs Field

Game 5
October 13, Jacobs Field

Game 6
October 15, Camden Yards

Awards and honors
 Eric Davis, Outfield, Roberto Clemente Award
Eric Davis, Hutch Award
Harry Dalton, 1997 Herb Armstrong Award (for contribution to the Orioles franchise by a non-uniform personnel
1997 Major League Baseball All-Star Game
Roberto Alomar, starter
Cal Ripken Jr., starter

Farm system
LEAGUE CHAMPIONS: Rochester, Delmarva, Bluefield

References

1997 Baltimore Orioles team page at Baseball Reference
1997 Baltimore Orioles season at baseball-almanac.com

Baltimore Orioles Season, 1997
Baltimore Orioles seasons
American League East champion seasons
Baltimore